Yimbulunga is a genus of spiders in the family Salticidae. It was first described in 2014 by three arachnologists,  Galina Azarkina, Anthony Russell-Smith and Wanda Wesołowska, in a joint publication with Wesołowska as the lead author. , it contains only one species, Yimbulunga foordi, found in South Africa.

References

Endemic fauna of South Africa
Monotypic Salticidae genera
Salticidae
Spiders of South Africa
Taxa named by Wanda Wesołowska